Samuel Wakefield (died 1883) was a postmaster, tax collector, school official, and state legislator in Louisiana. He represented Iberia Parish in the Louisiana Senate from 1877 to 1879. He was documented as being mulatto, literate, and having worked as a cooper and tax collector. He was born in St. Martin Parish, Louisiana. He had a wife and seven children.

He was deposed from office during the term of governor Francis T. Nicholls. His seat passed to George Wailles.

In 1879, his daughter Emma Wakefield-Paillet was the first black woman to qualify as a doctor in Louisiana. An older child, Adolph J. Wakefield, served as Clerk of Court for Iberia Parish between 1884 to 1888, the first African American to do so. On January 25, 1889, a younger son, also named Samuel Wakefield, was attacked and lynched by a mob while in the jail at New Iberia. At the time, he was in police custody, being held following the death of his employer by gunshot, apparently inflicted by the junior Wakefield, in a confrontation between the two. The family home was terrorized by a mob of angry white citizens. The family fled not long after and settled in New Orleans.

See also
African-American officeholders during and following the Reconstruction era

References

Year of birth missing
1883 deaths
People from New Iberia, Louisiana
People from New Orleans